Luther's Small Catechism is a catechism written by Martin Luther and published in 1529 for the training of children. Luther's Small Catechism reviews the Ten Commandments, the Apostles' Creed, the Lord's Prayer, the Sacrament of Holy Baptism, the Office of the Keys and Confession and the Sacrament of the Eucharist. It is included in the Book of Concord as an authoritative statement of what Lutherans believe. 

The Small Catechism is widely used today in Lutheran churches as part of youth education and Confirmation. It was mandatory for confirmands in the Church of Sweden until the 1960s.

See also
 
 Luther's Large Catechism

References

External links
 
 
 Luther's Small Catechism (1921 Triglotta version)
 Project Wittenberg version
 Luther's version in German
 

1529 books
1529 in Christianity
16th-century Christian texts
Book of Concord
Catechisms
Lutheran education
Religious works for children
Works by Martin Luther